Tachina apicalis is a species of fly in the genus Tachina of the family Tachinidae that can be found in China and Germany.

References

Diptera of Asia
Diptera of Europe
apicalis